The second USS Fresno (CL-121) was a United States Navy Juneau-class light cruiser launched on 5 March 1946 by Federal Shipbuilding and Dry Dock Company of Kearny, New Jersey, sponsored by Mrs. Ruth R. Martin; and commissioned on 27 November 1946, with Captain Elliott Bowman Strauss in command. She was reclassified CLAA-121 on 18 March 1949.

Service history
During her first operational cruise, from 13 January-7 May 1947, Fresno not only concluded her preliminary training in the Caribbean, but also visited Montevideo, Uruguay, during a presidential inauguration and called at Rio de Janeiro. On 1 August, she sailed from Norfolk, Virginia for a tour of duty which took her to ports both of northern Europe and the Mediterranean, returning to Norfolk on 1 December.

A second overseas deployment, from 3 March-19 June 1948, found Fresno visiting Amsterdam, Dublin, Bergen, and Copenhagen from her overseas base at Plymouth, England. Her coastwise operations from Norfolk included cruises to Prince Edward Island and Bermuda prior to her decommissioning at New York Naval Shipyard on 17 May 1949. Placed in reserve, she was berthed at Bayonne, New Jersey. She was sold for scrap on 17 June 1966.

Awards
World War II Victory Medal
Navy Occupation Medal with "EUROPE" clasp

Footnotes

Notes

Citations

References

External links

Juneau-class cruisers
1946 ships
Ships built in Kearny, New Jersey